The Parker House is a historic house in Winchester, Massachusetts.  This two story wood-frame house was probably built in the 1850s by Kenelum Baker, a local builder, and is an elaborately styled Italianate house.  It has wide eaves studded with paired brackets, and the porch, eave, and cupola all have a simple scalloped molding.  The square cupola has round-arch windows, and the porch wraps around three sides of the house.

The house was listed on the National Register of Historic Places in 1989.

See also
Kenelum Baker House, the builder's house
National Register of Historic Places listings in Winchester, Massachusetts

References

Houses on the National Register of Historic Places in Winchester, Massachusetts
Houses in Winchester, Massachusetts